Little Ship is an album by the American singer-songwriter Loudon Wainwright III, released in 1998 on Virgin Records/Charisma Records. According to Wainwright, the album "focuses primarily on the theme of a relationship. In terms of the other records, I don't know how or why I would place it somewhere except that it's the newest."

Track listing
All tracks composed by Loudon Wainwright III
"Breakfast in Bed" – 3:05
"Four Mirrors" – 2:55
"Mr. Ambivalent" – 3:44
"OGM" – 2:55
"Our Own War" – 3:50
"So Damn Happy" – 2:25
"Primrose Hill" – 4:47
"Underwear" – 1:30
"The World" – 1:49
"What Are Families For?" – 4:26
"Bein' a Dad" – 3:41
"The Birthday Present ll" – 3:51
"I Can't Stand Myself" – 2:41
"Little Ship" – 3:33
"A Song" – 3:05

Personnel
The following people contributed to Little Ship:

Musicians
Loudon Wainwright III – vocals, guitars, banjo, ukulele, "Bein' a Dad" chorus
John Leventhal – guitars, keyboards, percussion, harmonica, harmonium, lap steel, mandolin, bass, drums, "Bein' a Dad" chorus
Tony Garnier – bass ("Breakfast in Bed", "Mr. Ambivalent", "Our Own War", "Primrose Hill", "Bein' a Dad", "I Can't Stand Myself" and "Little Ship")
Shawn Pelton – drums ("Breakfast in Bed", "Mr. Ambvivalent", "Our Own War", "Bein' a Dad", "I Can't Stand Myself" and "Little Ship")
Rick Depofi – tenor saxophone, clarinet, bass clarinet ("What Are Families For?" and "I Can't Stand Myself")
Brian Mitchell – organ ("Mr. Ambivalent" and "I Can't Stand Myself")
Shawn Colvin – background vocals ("Mr. Ambivalent" and "Our Own War")
Larry Campbell – pedal steel ("Our Own War")
Sandra Park – violin leader ("Breakfast in Bed" and "A Song")
Sharon Yamanda – violin ("Breakfast in Bed" and "A Song")
Richard Sortomme – violin ("Breakfast in Bed" and "A Song")
Carol Webb – violin ("Breakfast in Bed" and "A Song")
Lisa E. Kim – violin ("Breakfast in Bed" and "A Song")
Daniel F. Reed – violin ("Breakfast in Bed" and "A Song")
Sue Pray – viola ("Breakfast in Bed" and "A Song")
Robert Rinehart – viola ("Breakfast in Bed" and "A Song")
Alan J. Stepansky – cello ("Breakfast in Bed" and "A Song")
Maria Kitsopoulos – cello ("Breakfast in Bed" and "A Song")
John Patitucci – bass ("Breakfast in Bed" and "A Song")
Chris Botti – trumpet ("Our Own War" and "The Birthday Present II")
Bob Carlisle – trumpet ("Our Own War" and "The Birthday Present II")
Jimmy Hynes – trumpet, flugelhorn ("Our Own War" and "The Birthday Present II")
Michael Davis – trombone ("Our Own War" and "The Birthday Present II")
Steve Addabbo – "Bein' a Dad" chorus

Arrangements
Stephen Barber – string arrangement ("A Song") and horn arrangement ("Our Own War")
Rick DePofi – horn arrangements ("What Are Families For?" and "I Can't Stand Myself")
John Leventhal – horn arrangements ("What Are Families For?", "I Can't Stand Myself" and "The Birthday Present II")

Recording personnel
John Leventhal – producer, recording, mixing
Loudon Wainwright III – producer
Mike Kappus – executive producer
Joe Blaney – recording
Scott Ansell – additional recording
Tom Shick]- recording assistant
John Reigart – recording assistant
Aaron Keane – recording assistant
Ken Feldman – recording assistant
Steve Addabbo – mixing ("Bein' a Dad", "I Can't Stand Myself", "Mr. Ambivilant" and "Our Own War")
Ted Jensen – mastering

Artwork
Hugh Brown – art direction, photography
Ellie Kompare – "Family" illustration
Katsushika Hokusai – "The Great Wave Off Kanagawa"

Release history
CD: Virgin CDV2844

References

Loudon Wainwright III albums
1998 albums
Albums produced by John Leventhal
Virgin Records albums
Charisma Records albums